William Granda Lewis (born August 8, 1985), is a Cuban professional basketball player.  He currently plays for the Ciego de Avila club of the LSB in Cuba.

He has been a member of Cuba's national basketball team. At the 2016 Centrobasket in Panama City, he was Cuba's best three point shooter (three point shots made).

References

External links
 Latinbasket.com profile
 REAL GM profile

1985 births
Living people
Cuban men's basketball players
Shooting guards
People from Ciego de Ávila
Club Atlético Tabaré basketball players